The Liar is a 1981 Finnish comedy film directed by Mika Kaurismäki.

Cast 
 Aki Kaurismäki - Ville Alfa
 Pirkko Hämäläinen - Tuula
  - Juuso
 Lars Lindberg - Harri
 Esa Sirkkunen - Olli
 Jukka Järvelä - Man at Bar Counter
 Marja Heiskanen - Kiosk Vendor
 Matti Pellonpää - Friend of Chandler

References

External links 

1981 comedy films
1981 films
Finnish comedy films